Pseudopostega zelopa is a moth of the family Opostegidae. It was described by Edward Meyrick in 1905. It is known from Pundalu-oya, Sri Lanka.

References

Opostegidae
Moths described in 1905